The Constitution of the State of New Hampshire is the fundamental law of the State of New Hampshire, with which all statute laws must comply. The constitution became effective June 2, 1784, when it replaced the state's constitution of 1776.

The constitution is divided into two parts: a Bill of Rights and a Form of Government. Subsections of each part are known as articles. For example, the subsection dealing with free speech and liberty of the press is cited as "Part I, Article 22" or "Pt. I, Art. 22."

Part I – Bill of Rights
Part First of the constitution is made up of 43 articles, codifying many of the same natural rights as does the United States Constitution, including free speech, freedom of the press, jury trials, freedom of religion, and the right to bear arms. It protects citizens against double jeopardy, unreasonable searches and seizures, and being required to quarter soldiers. In most cases, the state constitution affords more specific protections than the U.S. Constitution. Unlike the U.S. Constitution, New Hampshire's Bill of Rights has been amended regularly since its adoption.

Article 2-a. The Bearing of Arms
New Hampshire's constitution certifies the pro gun environment in the state. Article 2-a reads:

Article 7. State Sovereignty
New Hampshire has the ability to govern itself independently.

Article 10. Right of Revolution
New Hampshire is one of several states that codify a "Right of Revolution" in their state constitutions. The Right of Revolution dates back to the Revolutionary War. Article 10 reads:

Article 11. Elections and Elective Franchises.
In New Hampshire all elections are free and all inhabitants 18 or older are permitted to vote in their domicile. Persons convicted of "treason, bribery or any willful violation of the election laws of this state or of the United States" are excluded from voting in elections; which may be restored by the Supreme Court on notice to the Attorney General. The General Court is required to establish absentee ballot and voter qualification process for state and municipal ballot elections, which includes primaries. Polling and voter registration places are required to be "easily accessible to all persons" which specifically includes the disabled and elderly persons who are otherwise qualified to vote in the applicable election. Non-payment of any tax is not a permitted exclusion from voting. Every inhabitant of the state, having the proper qualifications, has equal right to be elected into office.

Article 12-a. Eminent domain

Article 12-a., which states that "No part of a person's property shall be taken by eminent domain...if the taking is for the purpose of private development...." was ratified in 2006. It was one of many actions that various states took, in the wake of Kelo v. City of New London the previous year, to limit the uses of eminent domain permitted by that decision.

Article 28-a. Unfunded mandates

Although counties, cities, and towns in New Hampshire are legal constructs of the state, Article 28-a. was added in 1984 to stop the practice by which the state expanded their duties. It provides that any "new, expanded or modified programs or responsibilities" must either be "fully funded by the state" or "approved for funding by a vote of the local legislative body...."

Article 36. Pensions
Article 36 barred the state from providing pensions except for "actual services...and never for more than one year at a time."  Article 36–a was added in 1984 to clarify that the state retirement system is constitutional, and to earmark its funds to pay the benefits due retirees.

Part II – Form of Government
Part Second contains 101 articles that specify how state government functions. Article 1 established The State of New Hampshire as the official name of the sovereign and independent state, formerly known as the province of New Hampshire. The remainder of Part II is subdivided in the following sections:

The General Court

Articles 2–8 establish the framework for the General Court and its authority to establish courts, enact state laws affecting the Government of New Hampshire, provide for the State's emergency powers, gather funding, and use collected monies.

House of Representatives

Articles 9–24 establish the authority and makeup of the House of Representatives, the lower house of the General Court. This section of the Constitution establishes how representatives are elected, their responsibilities, and their privileges. These articles make clear that all state-level budgetary legislation must originate from the House, much like the British House of Commons and the United States House of Representatives.

Articles 11 (formerly 10) and 11-a provide that representative districts are set by statute. Redistricting is often litigated. In 2002, the state supreme court dictated the districts.  Article 11 was last amended in 2006 to provide that towns whose size entitles them to one representative will have their own representative, but to allow the use of floterial districts spanning several towns or wards to achieve greater precision.

Article 15, Compensation of the Legislature, fixes the pay for General Court members at $200 per term (two years) and $250 for the presiding officers. Legislators also receive mileage for "actual daily attendance on legislative days, but not after the legislature shall have been in session for 45 legislative days or after the first day of July following the annual assembly of the legislature."

Senate

Articles 25–40, excluding 28 which was repealed in 1976, define the role and makeup of The Senate, the upper house of the General Court. This section is similar to the section regarding the House of Representatives, with the largest difference that the Senate is the ultimate arbiter of all elections.

Articles 38–40 describe how state officers may be impeached and be punished for bribery, corruption, malpractice or maladministration, in office. The House of Representatives is given the authority to impeach state officers, while the Senate hears, tries, and determines all impeachments made by the House. The articles also state the rules for the Senate's impeachment hearings and provide for the Chief Justice of the New Hampshire Supreme Court to preside over the impeachment hearings involving the Governor, but not have a vote.

Executive Power – Governor

Articles 41–59 define the roles and selection of the Executive Branch. The Governor of the State of New Hampshire (originally styled "President") is the supreme executive magistrate and is titled "His Excellency". The Governor is given the sole authority to command the New Hampshire National Guard and sole right to sign or veto bills and resolutions passed by the General Court and is charged with the "faithful execution of the laws". The Governor is elected to a two-year term at the November biennial elections, and must be 30 years old and have been a resident of the state for seven years at the time of election.

With the advice of the Executive Council, the Governor has the authority to call the General Court into session when in recess, to adjourn it early, and dissolve the General Court as required for the welfare of the state. The Governor, with the advice of the Council, has the authority to pardon offense not for impeachment; and to nominate and appoint all judicial officers, Attorney General, and all officers of the navy, and general and field officers of the state National Guard.

Article 58 states, "the governor and council shall be compensated for their services, from time to time, by such grants as the general court shall think reasonable;" and Article 59 requires that "permanent and honorable salaries" be established by law, for the justices of the superior court.

Council

Articles 60–66 discuss the selection, ejection and conduct of the five Executive Councilors.

Secretary, Treasurer, etc.

Articles 67–70 discuss the duties and selection of the state's treasurer, secretaries and other such officials.

County Treasurer, etc.
Article 71 details the responsibilities and powers of county level officials such as the county sheriffs, county attorneys, county treasurers, registrars of probate, and registrars of deeds. Article 72 details the selection of registrars of deeds, which usually is a countywide position.

Judiciary Power

Articles 72-a.–81 dictate the rights and responsibilities of the Supreme and Superior Courts as well as other state sanctioned court officers.

Clerks of Courts
Article 82 gives judges of the courts (except probate) the sole authority to appoint clerks to serve office during the pleasure of the judge. Clerks are prohibited from acting as attorneys in the court of which they are a clerk and from drawing any writ originating a civil action.

Encouragement of Literature, Trade, etc.
The first half of Article 83 tasks future legislators to "cherish the interest of literature and the sciences, and all seminaries and public schools...."  The text was amended in 1877 to clarify that state money could not go to religious schools.

In 1993, the New Hampshire supreme court agreed with school districts near Claremont in the first of several Claremont cases that Article 83 made equal public education a state responsibility. The Claremont cases began an era in which the supreme court repeatedly found school–funding legislation unconstitutional. In 2009, the court found the original suit was moot and the Claremont era ended. The General Court has debated, but has never approved, a constitutional amendment that would align the right of education with the legislature's authority to appropriate funds and the desire for local control.

The second half of Article 83, added in 1903, empowers the state to regulate economic activity. It declares a right to "free and fair competition in the trades and industries" and specifies that a goal of regulation is to "prevent...combination, conspiracy, monopoly, or any other unfair means."

Oaths and Subscriptions Exclusion From Offices, etc.

Articles 84–101 (excluding Articles 97 and 99) regard the installment of appointed and elected state officials; and the method for the Constitution taking effect, it being enrolled, and methods for proposing amendments.

Method of Amendment
Unlike the U.S. Constitution, in which amendments are set out beneath the main body (and brackets or strike-through are sometimes used to show text in the main body that an amendment has made inoperative), amendments to the New Hampshire constitution change the text in place. Although a law book with annotations describes amendments to the text, the actual amendment is not included in a presentation of the constitution; only the text as the amendment revised it. An amendment will sometimes add an article; for instance, an article following Article 12 will be called Article 12-a.

Amendments are proposed both to make policy changes and to make clerical changes such as gender neutrality.

Part II, Article 100 of the constitution provides for the following two methods of proposing amendments to the constitution:

General Court
A three-fifths vote of each house of the General Court is required to send a proposed constitutional amendment to ratification (see below).

Constitutional Convention
A majority vote of both houses of the General Court is required to place the following question on the ballot: "Shall there be a convention to amend or revise the constitution?" If such question has not been submitted to the people in ten years, the Secretary of State is required by Pt. II, Art. 100 to place the question on the ballot. A majority of qualified voters participating in an election is required to convene a convention. At the next election the delegates are elected by the people, or earlier as provided by the General Court. A three-fifths vote of the number of delegates is required to send a proposed constitutional amendment to ratification (see below).

Ratification
An amendment approved by either of the above methods is sent to the people at the next biennial November election. A two-thirds vote of the qualified voters participating in an election is required to ratify the amendment. If the amendment does not receive this vote, it does not take effect.

New Hampshire voters do not have the power to make or repeal laws through referendum, but a handful of proposed constitutional amendments routinely appear on the ballot in most general elections.

History
On June 5, 1781, a constitutional convention was convened and began writing the state's new constitution. In the Spring of 1782, a draft of the constitution was sent to town meetings for ratification. During the town meetings there were substantial proposed amendments that the Constitution was redrafted by the Convention and resubmitted to town meetings in Fall 1782. The second draft of the 1782 Constitution was met with even more proposed amendments. A third draft was necessary before it was resubmitted and accepted in the town meetings "as is." In Spring 1783, a requisite number of town meetings ratified the third draft and it became effective June 2, 1784. On October 31, 1783, the constitution was established and the Convention adjourned sine die, after having declared the constitution ratified.

On September 7, 1791, a constitutional convention began drafting 72 amendments to the 1784 Constitution be redrafted into a new whole document and submitted it to the people on February 8, 1792. The revisions of the 1784 Constitution submitted to the people became effective June 5, 1793.

Since 1793, there have been only five constitutional conventions. They have proposed 64 amendments, of which the voters have ratified 26. On November 6, 2012, voters for the seventeenth time declined to call a constitutional convention.

Before 1964, the only method for amending the constitution was by convention every seven years. The adoption of an amendment to Pt. II, Art. 100 allowed for either the General Court or Constitutional Convention to submit amendments to the people for adoption.

1776 Constitution

On January 5, 1776, the Congress of New Hampshire voted in Exeter to establish a civil government, and specified the manner and form that government would have. The Congress ratified the Constitution at the urging of the Continental Congress. The 1776 Constitution did not contain a Bill of Rights, nor was it submitted to the people of New Hampshire. The constitution was the first constitution ever ratified by an American commonwealth.

The Constitution established a legislature with two branches: a House of Representatives (or Assembly) and Council. The popularly elected convention which framed this Constitution was called a Congress, and it was to reconstitute itself as the House of Representatives. The House was to select 12 freeholders – a certain number from each county – to form the upper house, or Council. Should the conflict with Great Britain last beyond 1776, and barring instructions to the contrary from the Continental Congress, the Constitution provided for the popular election of the Councilors. Together the Assembly and Council were responsible for running the government of the colony, including the appointment of all civil and military officers. The Constitution did not provide for a chief executive of any kind.

References

External links
New Hampshire State Constitution (Official state website)
The Green Papers: State and Local Government 
Updyke, Frank A. "New Hampshire Constitutional Convention (in News and Notes)." The American Political Science Review. Vol. 7, No. 1. (Feb., 1913), pp. 133–137.
White, Leonard D. "The New Hampshire Constitutional Convention." Michigan Law Review. Vol. 19, No. 4. (Feb., 1921), pp. 383–394.

1784 documents
1784 in American law
1784 in New Hampshire
Constitution
New Hampshire